August Rush is a 2007 musical drama film directed by Kirsten Sheridan and produced by Richard Barton Lewis. The screenplay is by Nick Castle and James V. Hart, with a story by Paul Castro and Castle. It involves an 11-year-old musical prodigy living in an orphanage who runs away to New York City. He begins to unravel the mystery of who he is, all while his mother is searching for him and his father is searching for her. The many different sounds and rhythms he hears throughout his journey culminate in a major instrumental composition, which concludes the film ("August's Rhapsody").

Plot

In 1995, Lyla Novacek is a cellist studying at the Juilliard School and living under the strict rule of her father. Louis Connelly is the lead singer of an Irish rock band. They meet and have a one-night stand, but are unable to maintain contact. Lyla discovers that she is pregnant. Following an argument with her overbearing father over her unborn baby, she is struck by a car, forcing her to give birth prematurely. While Lyla is unconscious, her father secretly puts the baby boy up for adoption, telling Lyla that her son died.

Eleven years later, the baby is living in a boys' orphanage under the name Evan Taylor, where he is assigned to a social worker named Richard Jeffries. Evan is a musical genius and displays savant-like abilities and perfect pitch, which often causes him to be bullied. Convinced that his parents will find him, Evan runs away to New York City, "following the music" in the hope it will lead him to his family. He finds a boy named Arthur busking in Washington Square Park and follows Arthur to his home in a condemned theatre, where Evan is introduced to “Wizard” Wallace, an arrogant and aggressive vagrant and musician who teaches homeless, orphaned, and runaway children to be street performers. Evan tries playing Wizard's prize guitar, Roxanne (a Gibson J150ec). Evan is so good that Wizard gives him his old spot in Washington Square Park, along with the guitar, which was also Arthur's. He gives Evan the stage name "August Rush" and tries to market him to clubs. Seeing the posters that Jeffries has placed for the runaway Evan, Wizard destroys all the ones he finds, hoping to keep Evan for his own gain.

Louis now lives in San Francisco as a talent agent, while Lyla is a music teacher in Chicago. Louis reconnects with his brothers and decides to try to find Lyla. Lyla is called to her father's deathbed, where he confesses that her son is alive, causing Lyla to abandon her dying father and immediately start looking for her son.

On arriving at Lyla's apartment in Chicago, Louis talks to one of her neighbors, who mistakenly tells Louis she is on her honeymoon. Despairing, he ends up in New York, where he gets his band back together. After Jeffries meets Wizard and Arthur on the street and becomes suspicious, the police raid the derelict theatre in which Wizard and his "children" are living. Evan manages to evade the police and remembers Wizard's advice to never reveal his real name to anyone. Evan (now "August") takes refuge in a church, where he befriends a little girl named Hope, who introduces him to the piano and written music. Hope brings August and his abilities to the attention of the parish pastor, who takes August to Juilliard, where he once again impresses the faculty. A rhapsody takes shape from August's notes and homework.

In New York, Lyla goes to Jeffries' office, and Jeffries identifies Evan/August as her son. While looking for him, she takes up the cello again and accepts an offer to perform with the Philharmonic at a series of concerts in Central Park. August is selected to perform the rhapsody he has been composing at the same concert. However, Wizard interrupts the rehearsal and, claiming to be his father, manages to pull August out of the school.

On the day of the concert, August is back in his spot in Washington Square, while Wizard makes plans to smuggle him around the country to play. He meets Louis, and unaware of their blood relationship, they have an impromptu guitar duet. August tells him of his dilemma, and Louis encourages him to go. That evening, with help from Arthur, August escapes from Wizard through the subway and heads for his concert. Louis, after his own performance with his reunited band, sees Lyla's name on one of the banners and also heads for the park. Jeffries finds a misplaced flyer for "August Rush" with a picture, and also heads for the concert.

August arrives in time to conduct his rhapsody, which attracts both Lyla and Louis to the audience, where they are reunited. August finishes his rhapsody and as he turns to discover his parents, he smiles knowing that he has been right all along.

Cast
 Freddie Highmore as Evan Taylor / "August Rush"
 Keri Russell as Lyla Novacek, Evan's mother
 Jonathan Rhys Meyers as Louis Connelly, Evan's father
 Robin Williams as Maxwell "Wizard" Wallace
 Terrence Howard as Counselor Richard Jeffries
 Alex O'Loughlin as Marshall Connelly, Louis' older brother and Evan's paternal uncle
 William Sadler as Thomas Novacek, Lyla's father and Evan's maternal grandfather
 Marian Seldes as Dean Alice MacNeil
 Jamia Simone Nash as Hope
 Mykelti Williamson as Reverend James
 Leon Thomas III as Arthur
 Bonnie McKee as Lizzy
 Timothy Mitchum as Joey
 Becki Newton as Jennifer
 Aaron Staton as Nick
 Ronald Guttman as The Professor
 Michael Drayer as Mannix
 Tablo as Clarinet player (uncredited cameo)
 Koo Hye-sun as Girl on couch (cameo)

Music
"Moondance"Written by Van Morrison, Performed by Jonathan Rhys Meyers
"This Time"Written by Chris Trapper, Performed by Jonathan Rhys Meyers
"Bari Improv"Written by Mark Mancina and Kaki King, Performed by Kaki King
"Ritual Dance"Written by Michael Hedges, Performed by Kaki King
"Raise It Up"Written by Impact Repertory Theatre, Performed by Jamia Simone Nash and Impact Repertory TheatreNominated for an Academy Award for Best Original Song
"Dueling Guitars"Written by Heitor Pereira, Performed by Heitor Pereira and Doug Smith
"Someday"Written by J. Stephens, Performed by John Legend
"King of the Earth"Written and Performed by John Ondrasik
"God Bless the Child"Written by Arthur Herzog, Jr. and Billie Holiday, Performed by Chris Botti and Paula Cole
"La Bamba"Performed by Leon Thomas III
"August's Rhapsody" Written by Mark Mancina

The final number with Lyla and Louis begins with Lyla playing the Adagio-Moderato from Edward Elgar's Cello Concerto in E Minor.

Except for "Dueling Guitars", all of August's guitar pieces were played by American guitarist-composer Kaki King. King's hands are used in close-ups for August Rush.

Composer Mark Mancina spent over a year and a half composing the score of August Rush. "The heart of the story is how we respond and connect through music. It's about this young boy who believes that he's going to find his parents through his music. That's what drives him." The final theme of the movie was composed first. "That way I could take bits and pieces of the ending piece and relate it to the things that are happening in (August's) life. All of the themes are pieces of the puzzle, so at the end it means something because you've been subliminally hearing it throughout the film." The score was recorded at the Todd-AO Scoring Stage and the Eastwood Scoring Stage at Warner Bros.

Reception
August Rush received mixed reviews from film critics. , the film holds a 37% approval rating on the review aggregator Rotten Tomatoes, based on 123 reviews with an average rating of 4.83/10. The site's consensus reads: "Though featuring a talented cast, August Rush cannot overcome the flimsy direction and schmaltzy plot." On Metacritic, the film had an average score of 38 out of 100, based on 27 critics, indicating "generally unfavorable reviews".

In a review by USA Today, Claudia Puig commented, "August Rush will not be for everyone, but it works if you surrender to its lilting and unabashedly sentimental tale of evocative music and visual poetry." The Hollywood Reporter reviewed the film positively, writing "the story is about musicians and how music connects people, so the movie's score and songs, created by composers Mark Mancina and Hans Zimmer, give poetic whimsy to an implausible tale."

Pam Grady of the San Francisco Chronicle called the film "an inane musical melodrama." Grady said "the entire story is ridiculous" and "Coincidences pile on, behavior and motivations defy logic, and the characters are so thinly drawn that most of the cast is at a loss." Edward Douglas of comingsoon.net said it "does not take long for the movie to reveal itself as an extremely contrived and predictable movie that tries too hard to tug on the heartstrings."

Roger Ebert gave the movie three stars, calling it "a movie drenched in sentimentality, but it's supposed to be. The movie also came to a very sudden end, leaving it unfinished."

A few critics suggested that the film is essentially a musical adaptation of Dickens' Oliver Twist.

Awards
Despite the mixed reception, August Rush was praised for its music. The song "Raise It Up" was nominated for Best Original Song at the 80th Academy Awards, but lost to Once.

Stage adaptation
A musical theatre adaptation of August Rush premiered on May 3, 2019, at the Paramount Theatre in Aurora, Illinois. The book was written by Glen Berger, the music was composed by Mark Mancina, and the lyrics were written by both Berger and Mancina. The play was directed by John Doyle.

References

External links

Scoring Session Photo Gallery at ScoringSessions.com

2007 films
2000s musical drama films
English-language South Korean films
American musical drama films
Films about cellos and cellists
Films about music and musicians
Films shot in New York City
Films shot in New Jersey
Films set in New York City
Films set in Chicago
Films set in San Francisco
Films set in 1995
Films set in 2006
Films scored by Mark Mancina
Warner Bros. films
CJ Entertainment films
2000s English-language films
2000s American films